Nectandra venulosa is a species of plant in the family Lauraceae. It is endemic to Brazil.

References

IUCN Red List of all Threatened Species. 

venulosa
Endemic flora of Brazil
Data deficient plants
Taxa named by Carl Meissner
Taxonomy articles created by Polbot